Stenalia jendeki is a beetle in the genus Stenalia of the family Mordellidae. It was described in 2006 by Horák and is endemic to Cambodia. The species is named after Eduard Jendek, an entomologist with whom Horák worked.

References

jendeki
Beetles described in 2006
Endemic fauna of Cambodia